The 2016 Tour of Chongming Island was the tenth staging of Tour of Chongming Island, a women's stage race held in Shanghai, China. It ran from 6 to 8 May 2016 and was part of the UCI Women's World Tour.

Schedule

Results

Stage 1
6 May 2016 – Xincheng Park – Xincheng Park,

Stage 2
7 May 2016 – Xincheng Park – Xincheng Park,

Stage 3
8 May 2016 – Xincheng Park – Xincheng Park,

References

Chongming
Tour of Chongming Island
Tour of Chongming Island